Justin may refer to:

People
 Justin (name), including a list of persons with the given name Justin 
 Justin (historian), a Latin historian who lived under the Roman Empire
 Justin I (c. 450–527), or Flavius Iustinius Augustus, Eastern Roman Emperor who ruled from 518 to 527
 Justin II (c. 520–578), or Flavius Iustinius Iunior Augustus, Eastern Roman emperor who ruled from 565 to 578
 Justin (magister militum per Illyricum) (fl. 538–552), a Byzantine general
 Justin (Moesia), a Byzantine general killed in battle in 528
 Justin (consul 540) (c. 525–566), a Byzantine general
 Justin Martyr (103–165), a Christian martyr
 Justin (gnostic), 2nd-century Gnostic Christian; sometimes confused with Justin Martyr
 Justin the Confessor (d 269)
 Justin of Chieti, venerated as an early bishop of Chieti, Italy
 Justin of Siponto (c. 4th century), venerated as Christian martyrs by the Catholic Church
 Justin de Jacobis (1800–1860), an Italian Lazarist missionary who became Vicar Apostolic of Abyssinia and titular Bishop of Nilopolis
 Justin (singer, born 2002), stage name of Chinese singer Huang Minghao, member of NEXT

Geography
 Justin, Texas, a city in the United States

Entertainment
 Justin (robot), a humanoid robot developed by the German Aerospace Center (DLR)
 Justin.tv, a network of diverse channels providing a platform for lifecasting and live video streaming of events online
 Justin (2005 album), by Justin Lo
 Justin (2008 album), by Justin Lo
 "Justin", a song by Korn from the 1998 album Follow the Leader
 Justin, the main character of Grandia, a 1997 role-playing game

See also
 Saint Justin (disambiguation)
 Iustin Moisescu (1910–1986), Patriarch of All Romania
 Justinian
 Justinus (disambiguation)
 Justan (disambiguation)
 Justen (disambiguation)
 Juston (disambiguation)
 Justyn (disambiguation)